Goenda Baradacharan is a Bengali fictional detective character created by novelist Shirshendu Mukhopadhyay. The character first appeared in the novel Monojder Advut Bari. Thereafter, a short story Goenda Baradacharan was published in Anandamela magazine in 1976. Mukhopadhyay wrote a number of detective stories of Baradacharan, some of which were translated into English.

Character
Baradacharan is by profession a detective. He is a well built man, aged about 30 and uses a pistol. He has his old mother in his home. His nephew Chakku works as his assistant and he has a pet dog, Donkey. Baradacharan's activities is little comical and peculiar. He follows different and unorthodox styles of investigation to solve funny cases. Very often, he helps when people lose their vegetables or cattle.

Stories
 Kustir Pyanch
 Nayanchand
 Gayapatir Bipod
 Goenda Baradacharan
 Tahale
 Bahurupi Baradacharan
 Patalbabur Bipod

Film adaptation
Actor-politician Bratya Basu played the role of Baradacharan in Anindya Chattopadhyay’s movie Manojder Adbhut Bari.

References

Fictional Indian people
Fictional Bengali people
Fictional private investigators